Shad Mansur Mahalleh (also Romanized as Shād Manşūr Maḩalleh; also known as Shāh Manşūr Maḩalleh) is a village in Sakht Sar Rural District, in the Central District of Ramsar County, Mazandaran Province, Iran. At the 2006 census, its population was 466, in 127 families.

References 

Populated places in Ramsar County